K-143 is a  north–south state highway in Saline County, Kansas. The route runs through lands mostly used for agriculture from an interchange at Interstate 70 (I-70) and U.S. Route 40 (US-40) in northern Salina, Kansas generally northward to a junction with US-81 north of Salina. The southern part of the route is a four-lane divided highway while the rest is a two-lane highway. It has an annual average daily traffic (AADT) between 1,580 and 4,133 vehicles. The route is paved with three different pavement types, and is not a part of the National Highway System. It was first designated as US-81 Alternate in the early 1970s with the designation being changed to K-143 in the early 1980s.

Route description 

K-143's southern terminus is at a diamond interchange with I-70 in the northernmost parts of Salina, Kansas. For the first  of the route, the highway travels due north through commercial and agricultural land within the Salina city limits. A short distance after this, K-143 transitions from a divided four-lane highway into a two-lane highway. It then crosses the Saline River and continues north through primarily agricultural land north of Salina. At , K-143 turns northwest and follows a gently curving path in that direction for the remainder of the route. The highway then reaches its northern terminus at US-81.

K-143 has an AADT of 4,133 vehicles in the southernmost  of the route, with an AADT of 1,580–1,595 vehicles in the remainder of the route. The route is paved with a combination of full-design bituminous pavement, composite pavement, and partial-design bituminous pavement. K-143 is not a part of the National Highway System.

History 
K-143's route was established between 1970 and 1971 as US-81 Alternate. The numbering was changed to K-143 between 1981 and 1983.

Major intersections

References

External links

Route log

143
Transportation in Saline County, Kansas
U.S. Route 81